The Polish football league system is a series of leagues for club football in Poland.

The men's system 
As of 2022/23.
The Ekstraklasa lies at the top of the Polish football system, followed by I liga, II liga and III liga. From 5th tier there is regional level.

The women's system

References

External links
 Official PZPN website 

Football league systems in Europe
Football leagues in Poland